Government Hazi Mohammad Mohsin College (alternatively spelled Government Hazi Muhammad Mohsin College) is one of the renowned colleges of Bangladesh located in Chittagong, Bangladesh. Named after Muhammad Mohsin, a 19th-century philanthropist, it is one of the oldest educational institutions in the country. Originally established in British India. It offers Higher Secondary Certificate (HSC) (classes 11–12) in the national curriculum of Bangladesh coupled with bachelor's degree and master's degree in various disciplines in association with National University, Bangladesh.

History
Chittagong Madrasa was established in 1874 using a waqf donated by Muhammad Mohsin. In 1918, plans to improve education at the institution were developed and by 1927 it had gradually evolved into Islamic Intermediate College. Forty years later, a government-run higher secondary college was founded at the foot of the hill on which Islamic Intermediate College stood. On 20 July 1979, Hazi Muhammad Mohsin College came into existence when the two institutions merged.

Campus
The college has eight buildings which cover almost  of land. Two hostels situated to the west of the Administrative Building offer housing for one hundred students. Another hostel and the dean's residence are situated south of the Commerce Department Building. On top of a hill stands the college mosque.

One of the buildings is almost a century old. It is called Darul Adalat, and it was the first court of Chittagong under British colonial rule; the site may also have been fortified by Portuguese pirates in the 16th century. The locals refer to it the Portuguese Building due to its architectural style. Mohsin College (then Chittagong Madrasa) bought the hill, along with the building, for 30000 tk in 1879, and it remained central to the institution for many years, though by 2013 it had fallen into disrepair and was in danger of being demolished to make way for a library.

Faculties and department

The college teaches honours and offers master's degrees in 14 subjects. It has the faculties :
Faculty of Arts & Social Science
Faculty of Science
Faculty of Commerce

Faculty of Arts & Social Science 
The faculty comprises the following departments:
 Department of Bengali
 Department of English
 Department of Economics
 Department of Political Science
 Department of Islamic History and Culture
 Department of Philosophy
 Department of Sociology
 Department of Arabic & Islamic Studies

Faculty of Science 
The faculty comprises the following departments:
 Department of Physics
 Department of Chemistry
 Department of Botany
 Department of Zoology
 Department of Mathematics

Faculty of Commerce 
The faculty comprises the following departments:
 Department of Accounting
 Department of Management

College facility

Student dormitories 
There are two male and one female student dormitories.

College ground 
The college has a large ground known. n this ground students from the college and from other colleges play cricket, football, and volleyball.

Co-curricular activities 
 BNCC, the college has the HQ of Karnaphuly battalion-2 of Bangladesh National Cadet Corp. Two Sections are Army Wing and Naval Wing
 Rover Scout
 Mohsin College Debating Club-MCDC
 Cultural Podium Of Mohsin College-CPMC
 Bangladesh Red Crescent Society of Mohsin College

Administrative and academic buildings
College mosque

Notable alumni
 Abdul Wahid Bengali, co-founder of Al-Jamiatul Ahlia Darul Ulum Moinul Islam
 Abdul Hamid Madarshahi, co-founder of Al-Jamiatul Ahlia Darul Ulum Moinul Islam
 Sufi Azizur Rahman, co-founder of Al-Jamiatul Ahlia Darul Ulum Moinul Islam
 Shantanu Biswas - dramatist, playwright, singer-songwriter 
 Hasan Mahmud - Bangladeshi Minister and Parliamentarian
 Yasir Ali Chowdhury Bangladesh National Cricket Team
 M. Abdul Latif - Member of the Bangladeshi Jatiya Sangsad.
 Abdul Karim "5th Vice-Chancellor of the University of Chittagong"
 Abul Fazal "4th Vice-Chancellor of the University of Chittagong"
 Ohidul Alam "Bangladeshi writer, poet, historian, and journalist."

See also

 Bangladesh Open University 
 Board of Intermediate and Secondary Education, Chattogram
 Education in Bangladesh
 List of colleges in Chittagong
 National University, Bangladesh

References

External links 
 Mohsin College admission
 Home page
 Contact information

Colleges affiliated to National University, Bangladesh
Universities and colleges in Chittagong District
1874 establishments in India
Colleges in Chittagong